The name Son-Tinh, from Tản Viên Sơn Thánh, one of The Four Immortals in traditional Vietnamese mythology, has been used for two tropical cyclones in the northwestern Pacific Ocean. It replaced "Saomai", which was retired after the 2006 typhoon season.

 Typhoon Son-Tinh (2012) (T1223, 24W, Ofel) – a Category 3 typhoon that traversed the Philippines and later made landfall in northern Vietnam.
 Tropical Storm Son-Tinh (2018) (T1809, 11W, Henry) - A weak but deadly storm that caused severe floods and mudslides in Vietnam and in Laos.

Pacific typhoon set index articles